Club Atlético Colón de  Santa Fe, commonly referred to as Colón de Santa Fe , is a sports club from Santa Fe, Argentina. The football team plays in the First Division of the Argentine football league system, the Argentine Primera División.

It was born as football club and it is the main activity carried out. Also it has other disciplines like basketball, volleyball, hockey, women's football, boxing, futsal and swim.

The stadium named Estadio Brigadier General Estanislao López, in honor of an Argentinian leader governor of Provincia de Santa Fe between 1818 and 1838, has a capacity for 40000 people. The stadium is nicknamed «El Cementerio de los Elefantes» (Elephant Graveyard).

Joined in the Argentine Football Association in 1948 and obtains the first championship in 1965, ascending to First Division.

The institution's most important accomplishment is the championship of First Division Argentine Primera División 2021. Also it has the sub-championship in the international Copa Sudamericana 2019, and the Second Division Trophy Copa de Honor de Primera B "Juan Domingo Perón" in 1950. Finally, as a personal milestone, it has a victory in 1964 against the Pelé Santos FC.

History
The club was founded on 5 May 1905, as "Colón Foot-ball Club" by a group of friends that were enthusiastic about football. It was named after Cristóbal Colón (Christopher Columbus), whose biography was being studied by one of the boys at the time.

In 1965 Colon won the Primera B title.

The first game played by Colón in Primera was v Chacarita Juniors on 6 May 1966. After the first season in the top level Colón finished 16th, but the following year the structure of Argentine football was changed so as there were two championships each season, the Metropolitano and the Nacional, with entrance to the latter originally only available to the higher placed Metropolitano teams. Colon did not qualify for the Nacional until 1968, although the squad did then managed a 6th-place finish.

Colón finished 2nd in their group in the 1972 Nacional.

In 1975 the team made a good campaign in the Metropolitano, finishing in 6th place. This got better two years later, when Colón finished 5th in the Metropolitano, although the team then struggled in the Nacional. In 1978 Colón reached the knockout stages of the Nacional but was beaten in the quarter-finals by Independiente. 

Colon was relegated from the Metropolitana in 1981 having won only 6 games that season. It was to take 14 years for Colón to return to the top division (for the 1995–96 season). During the intervening period the team came close to promotion on a number of occasions, and lost Promotion Play-off games in 1988–89 to arch-rivals Union 3–0 on aggregate, and in 1992–93 Colón lost the championship play-off, being defeated by Banfield and then failed to qualify through the secondary play-offs. 

After a few mid-table finishes Colón was placed 2nd in the 1997 Clausura tournament, which is team's highest placed finish to date. As River Plate won both titles that season, a play-off was required between the two runners-up. In December 1997 Colón defeated Independiente 1–0 to qualify for the Copa Libertadores 1998. In the 2016–17 season, Colón drew an average home league attendance of 25,000.

The institution's greatest sporting achievement was achieved by becoming champion of the Professional League Cup 2021.

International competititons 

Colon made their South American debut in the Copa CONMEBOL 1997 against Universidad de Chile. They subsequently reached the semi-finals where they lost to fellow Argentine side Lanús. 

They made their debut in South America's most prestigious club tournament (Copa Libertadores) the following season. Their first game in the group stage was a 1–2 home defeat to River Plate, although they were still to qualify for the knockout stages. After beating Olimpia on penalties they were again drawn to play River Plate, but were defeated 5–2 on aggregate in the quarter-final. 

In 2003, they qualified for their 3rd different continental competition (Copa Sudamericana), and they defeated Vélez Sársfield before losing to Boca Juniors.

Stadium
The club's current stadium is the Estadio Brigadier General Estanislao López, which holds 40,000 spectators. The ground was inaugurated in 1946, and received a major renovation starting in 2002.

Players

Current squad

Out on loan

Managers

 Antonio Mohamed (2008–10)
 Fernando Gamboa (2010–11)
 Mario Sciaqua (2011–12)
 Roberto Sensini (2012–13)
 Rubén Forestello (2013)
 Diego Osella (2014)
 Reinaldo Merlo (2014-15)
 Javier López (2015)
 Dario Franco (2015-16)
 Ricardo Johansen (2016)
 Paolo Montero (2016)
 Eduardo Domínguez (2017-18)
 Esteban Fuertes (Interim) (2018)
 Julio Comesaña (2019)
 Marcelo Goux (Interim) (2019)
 Pablo Lavallen (2019)
 Diego Osella (2020)
 Eduardo Domínguez (2020-21)
 Julio César  Falcioni (2022)
  Marcelo Saralegui (2023)

Honours 
Copa de la Liga Profesional (1): 2021
Primera B (1): 1965

Second Level Cups 
Torneo de Honor : 1950

Notes

References

External links

 

 
Association football clubs established in 1905
Colon
Basketball teams in Argentina
Argentine field hockey clubs
Argentine volleyball teams
1905 establishments in Argentina
Basketball teams established in 1905